The 2008 United States Senate election in Alabama was held on November 4, 2008, to elect one of Alabama's members to the United States Senate. Incumbent Republican U.S. Senator Jeff Sessions won re-election to a third term.

Background 
Since 1980, Alabama voters have increasingly voted for Republican candidates at the Federal level, especially in Presidential elections. By contrast, Democratic candidates have been elected to many state-level offices and, until 2010, comprised a longstanding majority in the Alabama Legislature; see Dixiecrat.

In 2004, George W. Bush won Alabama's nine electoral votes by a margin of 25 percentage points with 62.5% of the vote. The eleven counties that voted Democratic are part of the Black Belt counties, where African Americans are the majority racial group.

On January 10, 2007, Rep. Artur Davis announced that he would not run for the seat. Despite voting heavily for George W. Bush in 2004, Alabama still had a strong Democratic presence in 2008, and Democrats controlled majorities in both chambers in the Alabama Legislature. Commissioner of Agriculture and Industries Ron Sparks appeared to be preparing for a run, but on June 12, 2007, he announced that he would not seek the Senate seat, in order to avoid a primary battle with State Senator Vivian Davis Figures.

Primary elections were held on June 3.

Republican primary 
Sessions' approval rating was 56% in December 2007.

Candidates 
 Earl Mack Gavin, perennial candidate
 Jeff Sessions, incumbent U.S. Senator since 1997

Results

Democratic primary

Candidates 
 Vivian Davis Figures, State Senator
 Johnny Swanson, Army veteran
 Mark Townsend, candidate for Governor in 2002

Results

General election

Candidates 
 Vivian Figures (D), State Senator
 Darryl W. Perry (write-in), Libertarian Party nominee for Pennsylvania State Treasurer in 2004 and candidate for Mayor of Birmingham in 2007
 Jeff Sessions (R), incumbent U.S. Senator

Predictions

Polling

Results

See also 
 2008 United States Senate elections

References

External links 
 2008 Election Information from the Secretary of State of Alabama
 U.S. Congress candidates for Alabama at Project Vote Smart
 Alabama U.S. Senate race from Congress.org
 Alabama, U.S. Senate from CQ Politics
 Alabama U.S. Senate race from The Green Papers
 Alabama U.S. Senate race from OurCampaigns.com
 Alabama U.S. Senate race from 2008 Race Tracker
 Campaign contributions from OpenSecrets
 Sessions (R-i) vs Figures (D) graph of multiple polls from Pollster.com
 Election News from Alabama Live news media
 Vivian Davis Figures, Democratic candidate
 Darryl W. Perry, Write-in candidate (Alabama Statesmen/Boston Tea Party)
 Jeff Sessions, Republican incumbent
 Johnny Swanson, Democratic candidate

2008
Alabama
United States Senate